Brissac Loire Aubance is a commune in the Maine-et-Loire department of western France. The municipality was established on 15 December 2016 and consists of the former communes of Les Alleuds, Brissac-Quincé, Charcé-Saint-Ellier-sur-Aubance, Chemellier, Coutures, Luigné, Saint-Rémy-la-Varenne, Saint-Saturnin-sur-Loire, Saulgé-l'Hôpital and Vauchrétien.

Population

See also 
Communes of the Maine-et-Loire department

References 

Communes of Maine-et-Loire